Édouard Dupiré (13 July 1904 – 27 August 1968) was a French athlete. He competed in the men's high jump at the 1924 Summer Olympics.

References

External links
 

1904 births
1968 deaths
Athletes (track and field) at the 1924 Summer Olympics
French male high jumpers
Olympic athletes of France
Place of birth missing
20th-century French people